Affiche Rouge (Red Poster) is a 1944 anti-French Resistance propaganda poster that also refers to the prosecution of the group targeted by the poster.

Affiche Rouge may also refer to:

 Affiche Rouge (1871), an 1871 French poster that called for a revolutionary Commune government, which later came as the Paris Commune
 "L'affiche rouge", a 1961 song by Léo Ferré
 , a 1976 French film by Frank Cassenti; winner of the 1976 Prix Jean Vigo